Gorlitz is a hamlet in southeastern Saskatchewan. The hamlet was named after Görlitz in Saxony, Germany by Karl Gebek, a German settler.

References

Good Lake No. 274, Saskatchewan
Unincorporated communities in Saskatchewan
Division No. 9, Saskatchewan